This Is Bat Country is the second official studio album by Australian pop punk band Short Stack, released through Sunday Morning Records on 12 November 2010. The band claims that the sound of their new music (which is a more rock sound) is not a change, but merely a progression from a more pop sound. The album peaked at number 6 on the ARIA charts and was certified gold.

Track listing

Charts

Weekly charts

Year-end charts

Certification

References

2010 albums
Short Stack albums